Andrew Boychuk (born May 17, 1941) is a retired long-distance runner.

Boychuk represented Canada at the 1968 Summer Olympics in the men's marathon. There he finished in tenth place. He won the gold medal in the men's marathon at the 1967 Pan American Games.

References
 Canadian Olympic Committee

1941 births
Living people
Canadian male long-distance runners
Athletes (track and field) at the 1966 British Empire and Commonwealth Games
Athletes (track and field) at the 1970 British Commonwealth Games
Athletes (track and field) at the 1967 Pan American Games
Athletes (track and field) at the 1968 Summer Olympics
Canadian people of Ukrainian descent
Olympic track and field athletes of Canada
Sportspeople from Clarington
Track and field athletes from Ontario
Pan American Games gold medalists for Canada
Commonwealth Games competitors for Canada
Pan American Games medalists in athletics (track and field)
Medalists at the 1967 Pan American Games
20th-century Canadian people